Myrsini (before 1915: Σουλεϊμάναγα - Souleimanaga) is a town in Elis, Greece. It is part of the municipal unit of Lechaina since 1997. In 2011, it had a population of 1,135. Myrsini lies in a flat coastal plain that stretches from Amaliada to Kato Achaia. It is 3 km southwest of Lechaina and 3 km northwest of Andravida.

History

Myrsini is named after the ancient city of Myrsinos or Myrtountion (named in Homer's Iliad and in Strabo's Geographica V), which was located in the area. According to Homer, Myrsinos took part in the Trojan War together with all of the Eleans (Iliad II.616). During the Byzantine Empire, a village named Agios Nikolaos (St Nicholas) was located in the area. Only part of its church altar survives today. In the 16th century, the inhabitants moved further inland to escape corsair raids and founded the present village. During the Ottoman era, the village was named Suleymanaga (Σουλεϊμάναγα), after a local Ottoman governor named Suleyman Agha.

Along with the rest of the Peloponnese, the village was conquered in 1685 by the Republic of Venice during the Morean War, but was recovered by the Ottomans in 1715. It became a part of Greece after the Greek War of Independence, and was renamed to its present name in 1915.

Population

Notable residents
Notable residents of Myrsini include:
 Debbie Flevotomou (29 July 1981 – Present), architect
 Peter Katholos former footballer who played for Sydney Olympic F.C. and Athlitiki Enosi Larissa F.C.

References

External links
GTP - Myrsíni

Populated places in Elis
Geography of ancient Elis
Cities in ancient Peloponnese
Lechaina
Dissolved municipalities and communes in Greece